Paul's Green is a hamlet between Leedstown and Townshend in west Cornwall, England, UK.

References

Hamlets in Cornwall